Katalin Bor (born February 10, 1990 in Budapest) is a Hungarian swimmer, who specialized in breaststroke events. She represented her nation Hungary at the 2008 Summer Olympics, and has won a career total of two medals (one silver and one bronze) in a major international competition, spanning the 2006 European Junior Swimming Championships in Palma de Mallorca, Spain.

Bor competed for Hungary in the women's 200 m breaststroke at the 2008 Summer Olympics in Beijing. Leading up to the Games, she cleared a FINA B-standard entry time of 2:31.13 from the national championships in Budapest. Swimming on the outside lane in heat three, Bor overhauled a 2:30-barrier to touch out Morocco's Sara El Bekri at the final turn for the third spot by nine hundredths of a second (0.09) with a lifetime best of 2:29.95. Bor failed to advance into the semifinals, as she placed twenty-seventh out of 41 swimmers in the prelims.

References

External links
NBC Olympics Profile

1990 births
Living people
Hungarian female swimmers
Olympic swimmers of Hungary
Swimmers at the 2008 Summer Olympics
Hungarian female breaststroke swimmers
Swimmers from Budapest
21st-century Hungarian women